Taiqian railway station is a railway station in Taiqian County, Puyang, Henan, China. It is an intermediate stop on the Beijing–Kowloon railway. North of the station, there is a connection to the freight-only Shanxi–Henan–Shandong railway.

References 

Railway stations in Henan
Railway stations in China opened in 1996